The South Zone women's cricket team is a women's cricket team that represents southern India in the Women's Senior Inter Zonal One Day and Women's Senior Inter Zonal T20. It is a composite team of players from six teams from southern India: Andhra, Goa, Hyderabad, Karnataka, Kerala and Tamil Nadu. They were formed in 1974–75 to play in the Rani Jhansi Trophy, which they competed in until 2002–03, when the competition ended. They then competed in the Inter Zone Women's One Day Competition, and then in the Inter Zone Women's Three Day Competition, where they finished as runners-up in the final tournament, in 2017–18.

History
South Zone Women first played in the Rani Jhansi Trophy in the 1974–75 season, a List A competition. They competed in the tournament until it was dissolved after the 2002–03 season, but full results for the trophy are not recorded.

In 2007, South Zone began playing in the Inter Zone Women's One Day Competition, which they competed in between the 2006–07 season until it ended after the 2013–14 season. Their best finishes in the tournament came in 2006–07 and 2012–13, when they finished as runners-up.

In the 2014–15 season, the zonal teams began competing in a two-day competition, the Inter Zone Women's Two Day Competition. In the first season, South Zone finished 4th out of the 5 teams with 6 points. The following season, 2015–16, the tournament became a three-day competition and South Zone finished 3rd, this time with 8 points. In 2016–17, the side finished bottom of the league, losing three of their four matches. They bounced back the following season however, taking their best finish in the competition as the came second, with two wins from their four matches.

In 2022–23, zonal cricket in India returned, in the form of the Women's Senior Inter Zonal T20. They finished third out of sixth teams in the first edition of the tournament. In February 2023, the 2022–23 Women's Senior Inter Zonal One Day tournament took place, in which they finished fourth in the group stage.

Players

Current squad
Based on squad announced for the 2022–23 season. Players in bold have international caps.

Seasons

Inter Zone Women's Three Day Competition

Women's Senior Inter Zonal T20

Women's Senior Inter Zonal One Day

Honours
 Inter Zone Women's One Day Competition:
 Winners (0): 
 Best finish: Runners-up (2006–07 & 2012–13)
 Senior Women's Cricket Inter Zonal Three Day Game:
 Winners (0):
 Best finish: Runners-up (2017–18)
 Women's Senior Inter Zonal T20:
 Winners (0):
 Best finish: 3rd (2022–23)
 Women's Senior Inter Zonal One Day:
 Winners (0):
 Best finish: 4th (2022–23)

References

External links
 South Zone at CricketArchive

Indian women's first-class cricket teams